Hannu Pikkarainen (born October 13, 1983) is a Finnish professional ice hockey defenceman currently an unrestricted free agent who most recently played for the Iserlohn Roosters of the Deutsche Eishockey Liga (DEL).

Playing career
Pikkarainen is a product of Helsinki-based club HIFK and made his professional debut with the club in the SM-liiga during the 2002–03 season. He left HIFK to play in the American Hockey League with the Hartford Wolf Pack during the 2006-07 season. Pikkarainen saw action in seven AHL contests and played in eleven games for ECHL's Charlotte Checkers that year before returning to HIFK the following season. After another two years with HIFK, he embarked on a journeyman career including stints in the Swedish Hockey League with Modo Hockey, Skellefteå AIK, Leksands IF, two stints in the Kontinental Hockey League with HC Dynamo Minsk and Medvescak Zagreb and a stop at TPS in the Finnish Liiga, before joining back HIFK.

On May 29, 2015, Pikkarainen concluded his third stint with HIFK and signed a one-year deal with German club Schwenninger Wild Wings. When his contract was up, he agreed to terms with fellow DEL side Iserlohn Roosters inking a deal for the 2016–17 season. In 41 games with the Roosters, Pikkarainen contributed with 2 goals and 18 points as Iserlohn finished out of playoff contention. On March 3, 2017, it was announced that his contract would not be renewed.

References

External links

1983 births
Living people
Finnish ice hockey defencemen
Charlotte Checkers (1993–2010) players
HC Dinamo Minsk players
Hartford Wolf Pack players
HIFK (ice hockey) players
Iserlohn Roosters players
KHL Medveščak Zagreb players
Leksands IF players
Modo Hockey players
Schwenninger Wild Wings players
Ice hockey people from Helsinki
Skellefteå AIK players
HC TPS players